Jack Wu Lok Yin (born 23 August 1977) is a television actor and host from Hong Kong, working for TVB. Jack debuted as a singer by joining singing competition and released two albums in 1997 before joining TVB as an artist.

Personal life
Jack Wu was born on 23 August 1977. His name Lok Yin is artist name. He came from a simple family where his dad was a fireman and his mom was a seamstress. He has a little brother.

Romantic sparks between him and his wife, June Chan (who was also a TVB Artist, now Social Media Influencer) during the filming of The King of Yesterday and Tomorrow. They got married in 2009 and have 3 children now.

Filmography

TV Series

TV Show (Host)

Discography

References

External links
Official TVB Blog

1977 births
Living people
TVB actors
Hong Kong male television actors
Hong Kong television presenters
21st-century Hong Kong male actors